Eladio Alberto Rojas Díaz (8 November 1934, in Tierra Amarilla, Chile – 13 January 1991, in Viña del Mar, Chile) was a former Chilean footballer who played as a midfielder for Everton and Colo-Colo of Chile, River Plate of Argentina, and the Chile national football team in the 1962 FIFA World Cup on home soil. Rojas scored the match winning goal for Chile in the 90th minute against Yugoslavia in the 1962 World Cup; his goal secured a third place finish for the World Cup hosts, which is Chile's best finish in the tournament to date. Rojas was also a starter on the River Plate teams of the 1960s that fiercely contested the Argentine Primera División title. While Rojas never won the title, River Plate did manage to place second in 1962 and 1963 as well as third in 1964.

Teams
 Everton 1954–1962
 River Plate 1962–1965
 Colo-Colo 1965–1967
 Everton 1967–1968

Personal life
His cousin, Leonel Herrera Rojas, is a historical player of Colo-Colo and the Chile national team and, also, the father of Leonel Herrera Silva, who scored in the 1991 Copa Libertadores final match for the same team.

Honours

Club
River Plate
 Copa Ciudad de Bogotá (1): 1964
 Copa Confraternidad Iberoamericana (1):

International
Chile
 FIFA World Cup Third place (1): 1962
 Copa O'Higgins (1): 1966

References

External links
 Profile at FIFA.com Profile at

1934 births
1991 deaths
People from Copiapó Province
Chilean footballers
Chile international footballers
Chilean expatriate footballers
Everton de Viña del Mar footballers
Club Atlético River Plate footballers
Colo-Colo footballers
Chilean Primera División players
Argentine Primera División players
Chilean expatriate sportspeople in Argentina
Expatriate footballers in Argentina
1962 FIFA World Cup players
Association football midfielders